The 2012 Orienteering World Cup was the 18th edition of the Orienteering World Cup. It contained 13 competitions, which took place in Sweden, Switzerland, Norway and Finland. The European Orienteering Championships in Falun, Sweden and the 2012 World Orienteering Championships in Lausanne, Switzerland were included in the World Cup.

Events

Men

Women

Overall standings
This section shows the final standings after all 13 events.

References

External links
International Orienteering Federation

Orienteering World Cup seasons
Orienteering competitions